Enrique Zschuschen (born May 30, 1975) is an Aruban football player. He appeared once for the Aruba national team in 2004.

References

1975 births
Living people
Aruban footballers
Association football forwards
Aruba international footballers